Răceanu is a surname of Romanian origin. Notable people with the surname include:

Grigore Răceanu (1906–1996), Romanian communist politician
Mircea Răceanu, Romanian diplomat, adopted son of Grigore

Romanian-language surnames